Richard Slater Milnes (1759–1804) was an English heir, landowner and politician. The heir to a cloth fortune, he served in the British Parliament, where he championed the abolitionist cause.

Early life
Richard Slater Milnes was born in December 1759 to Robert Milnes, a Presbyterian cloth merchant, who he succeeded in 1771. His mother, Joyce, was the daughter of Adam Slater. Milnes graduated from the University of Glasgow in Scotland in 1775.

Career
Milnes was a country gentleman at his Fryston Hall estate in Yorkshire. He served as a Member of Parliament for the City of York in the House of Commons of Great Britain from 1784 to 1790. During his tenure, he gave a speech in favour of the abolition of the slave trade and was a supporter of William Pitt the Younger.

Personal life
Milnes married Rachel, the daughter of Hans Busk, and had 2 sons and 7 daughters. They resided at Fryston Hall.

Death
Milnes died on 2 June 1804. He was succeeded by his eldest son Robert Pemberton Milnes
who also became an MP.

References

1759 births
1804 deaths
People from Selby
Alumni of the University of Glasgow
Members of the Parliament of Great Britain for English constituencies
British MPs 1784–1790
British MPs 1790–1796
British MPs 1796–1800
Members of the Parliament of the United Kingdom for English constituencies
UK MPs 1801–1802